The 2009 Ladies Tour of Qatar was the first edition of the Ladies Tour of Qatar cycling stage race. It was rated by the UCI as category 2.1, and was held between 8 and 10 February 2009, in Qatar.

Stages

Stage 1
8 February 2009 – Doha to Doha, 

The sprint of the front group of 21 riders was won by Giorgia Bronzini before Kirsten Wild and Ellen van Dijk.

Stage 2
9 February 2009 – Doha to Oryx Farm,

Stage 3
10 February 2009 – Camelodrome to Al Khawr, 

Team Flexpoint split the bunch with about 10 kilometres to go. After the bunch regrouped slightly, Ellen van Dijk attacked with 800 metres to go. The headwind was very strong and Van Dijk couldn't stay away. The bunch sprint was won by Giorgia Bronzini before Rochelle Gilmore and Kirsten Wild, who won the general and points classification. Ellen van Dijk, finishing 6th, won the Best Young Rider's classification.

Classification leadership
In the 2009 Ladies Tour of Qatar, three different jerseys are awarded. For the general classification, calculated by adding each cyclist's finishing times on each stage, and allowing time bonuses for the first three finishers on each stage and in intermediate sprints, the leader receives a golden jersey. This classification is considered the most important of the Tour of Qatar, and the winner is considered the winner of the Tour.

Additionally, there is a points classification, which awards a silver jersey. In the points classification, cyclists get points for finishing in the top three in an intermediate sprint or the top twenty of a stage. The first in an intermediate sprint gets 3 points, second 2, and third a single point. The stage win affords 30 points, second is worth 27 points, 25 for third, 23 for fourth, 21 for fifth, 19 for sixth, 17 for seventh, 15 for eighth, 13 for ninth, 11 for tenth, and one point less per place down the line, to a single point for twentieth.

There is also a youth classification, which awards a blue jersey. This classification is calculated the same as the general classification, but only riders born on or after January 1, 1984, are eligible.

Final classifications

General classification

Points Classification

Youth Classification

New Columbia-Highroad women's team rider Ellen van Dijk secured the Best Young Rider prize. Van Dijk's consistency after taking the jersey on the first day when she made it into the front group of 21 riders. The last hour of the last stage was a tense affair for the Dutchwoman, when she was caught on the wrong side of a split. She had to get past seven groups and finally crossed the line in sixth place, in the same time as stage winner, and won the Best Young Rider's classification.

References

External links

Tour of Qatar
Tour of Qatar
Ladies Tour of Qatar